The Jockey Club Creative Arts Centre (JCCAC) is a multi-disciplinary arts centre in Shek Kip Mei, Hong Kong, housed in a converted nine-storey factory estate.

JCCAC was established through the co-operation of the Hong Kong Arts Development Council (HKADC) and the Hong Kong Arts Centre (HKAC) and is a subsidiary of Hong Kong Baptist University (HKBU). It is funded by the Hong Kong Jockey Club Charities Trust and is supported by the Home Affairs Bureau. The JCCAC officially opened on 26 September 2008 as a self-financed registered charity.

Establishment
31 October 2005, JCCAC opening ceremony was held.
21 November 2006, tenant applications were opened.
January 2007, applications outnumbered places 5:1. JCCAC selected 112 applicants, six arts organisations, 88 artists or arts groups and the remainder being students or graduates of arts institutes.
28 February 2008, completion of the construction of JCCAC.
March 2008, the first tenants moved into the centre.
26 September 2008, JCCAC was officially opened.

Architecture
The building housing the JCCAC was formerly known as the Shek Kip Mei Flatted Factory Building or the Shek Kip Mei Factory Estate. The Factory Estate was built in 1977 and comprised one nine-storey block accommodating 390 factory units. It was a facility of housing cottage and local light industries in the late 1970s and was owned by the Hong Kong Housing Authority (HA).  It fell into disuse particularly due to a steep decline in the local garment industry in 1990s in Hong Kong when owners started to move their businesses to mainland China. The building was vacant from May 2001. 

The JCCAC was the first adaptive reuse attempt in Hong Kong to convert a decommissioned factory building into a creative arts centre. The interior of the centre retains architectural features of factories (architecturally it is reminiscent of London's Tate Modern). The conversion was awarded 'Medal of the Year of Hong Kong' in HKIA Annual Awards 2008 by the Hong Kong Institute of Architects (HKIA).

The design aims to strike a fine balance between new and old features in order to achieve integration with the surrounding neighbourhood and to preserve the inherent characteristics of the old factory building. Local design firm G.O.D. maintains a Street Culture Gallery featuring pop-culture artefacts from Hong Kong's past for the Jockey Club Creative Arts Centre that is a home to artists and art groups for the production and display of their works.

Management
The Jockey Club Creative Arts Centre is currently managed by the Hong Kong Baptist University under a seven-year Entrustment Agreement with the Hong Kong Government, in partnership with the Hong Kong Arts Development Council and the Hong Kong Arts Centre. The University received a total of HK$94.4 million (HK$69.4 million + HK$25 million) funding donation from the Hong Kong Jockey Club's Charities Trust (JCCT) in 2005 and 2007 for renovating the vacated factory building and disbursing part of the start-up costs. Ms. Lillian Hau Cheuk-ki is the Executive Director of JCCAC started from 3 May 2010 by the appointment from the Hong Kong Creative Arts Centre Limited while Mr. Eddie Lui Fung-ngar is the former Executive Director of the centre between 1 July 2007 to February 2010. The Centre is managed by an HKBU subsidiary company with charitable status, namely the Hong Kong Creative Arts Centre Limited which is operated on self-financing basis. The present Chairman of the Governing Board is William Leung Wing-cheung.

Facilities
The Jockey Club Creative Arts Centre provides a total of 131 studio units (each unit measuring 24 square metres) at affordable rent encompassing a wide spectrum of the various tenants’ arts including painting, sculpture, ceramics, photography, glass art, multi-media design, folk art, film and video art, music, dance, multi-media performance, community art and art education. The Centre also has supporting facilities such as a Black Box Theatre, two exhibition galleries, and a central courtyard for organisation of programmes and activities. On the lorry of the building (Level-1), a few rental spaces are reserved for commercial outlets like cafeteria, a commercial art gallery and a Chinese tea house, etc. to provide eating places for the artists.

Photo gallery

Controversies

Various problems
"Artists complained about bureaucratic management, unusable public space, inadequate publicity and poor facilities. Visitors were unhappy to find many studios closed as a result of some artists saying they simply wanted a quiet place to work."

Rent rises
"Artists are unhappy about a sudden 20 per cent rent increase for studio space.  All occupants of the factory turned artist incubator would have to pay a new elevated rate of HK$7.80 per square foot – up from HK$6.50 per sq ft for many – once their contracts come due.  Although the centre had warned tenants last year(2011) they would have to pay HK$7.50 per sq ft starting this year(2012), the back-to-back rent rises took many by surprise. 'I am not against increasing the rent if it's necessary,' said tenant Mac Mak Keung-wai of the A&M Art Workshop. 'I just feel that this is a commercially driven decision and that it strays from the original vision of the centre.'"

See also
 Public factory estates in Hong Kong
 Shek Kip Mei Estate
 Cattle Depot Artist Village
 Fo Tan
 West Kowloon Cultural District
 Hong Kong Arts Centre
 Hong Kong Visual Arts Centre
 Hong Kong Fringe Club
 798 Art Zone
 M+

References

External links 

 Jockey Club Creative Arts Centre (JCCAC)
 Hong Kong Arts Development Council (HKADC)
 Jockey Club Creative Arts Centre Opening 26/9/2008 (Youtube)

Hong Kong art
Arts centres in Hong Kong
Shek Kip Mei
Factory buildings in Hong Kong
2008 establishments in Hong Kong